Rumtek Monastery, also called the Dharma Chakra Centre, is a gompa located in the Indian state of Sikkim near the capital Gangtok. It is the seat-in-exile of the Gyalwang Karmapa, inaugurated in 1966 by the 16th Karmapa. It is also a focal point for the sectarian tensions within the Karma Kagyu school of Tibetan Buddhism that characterize the 17th Karmapa controversy.

History
Originally built under the direction of Changchub Dorje, 12th Karmapa Lama in the mid-18th century, Rumtek served as the main seat of the Karma Kagyu lineage in Sikkim for some time. But when Rangjung Rigpe Dorje, 16th Karmapa, arrived in Sikkim in 1959 after fleeing Tibet, the monastery was in ruins. Despite being offered other sites, the Karmapa decided to rebuild Rumtek. To him, the site possessed many auspicious qualities and was surrounded by the most favorable attributes. For example, flowing streams, mountains behind, a snow range in front, and a river below. With the generosity and help of the Sikkim royal family and the local folks of Sikkim, it was built by the 16th Karmapa as his main seat in exile.

After four years, construction of the monastery was completed. The sacred items and relics brought out from Tsurphu Monastery, the Karmapa's seat in Tibet, were installed. On Losar in 1966, the 16th Karmapa officially inaugurated the new seat, called "The Dharmachakra Centre, a place of erudition and spiritual accomplishment, the seat of the glorious Karmapa.

The monastery is currently the largest in Sikkim. It is  home to the community of monks and where they perform the rituals and practices of the Karma Kagyu lineage. A golden stupa contains the  relics of the 16th Karmapa. Opposite that building is a college, Karma Shri Nalanda Institute for Higher Buddhist Studies.

Controversy
Rumtek is in the centre of the Karmapa controversy, with a lengthy battle being played out in the Indian courts. Two rival organisations, each supporting a different candidate for the 17th Karmapa, claim stewardship of the monastery and its contents. The two organisations are the Tsurphu Labrang (supporting Ogyen Trinley Dorje) and the Karmapa Charitable Trust (supporting Trinley Thaye Dorje). Since 1992, the monastery has been the site of pitched battles between monks supporting one candidate or the other.

Neither candidate resides, nor has been enthroned, at Rumtek. Ogyen Trinley Dorje was enthroned at Tsurphu Monastery. Monks supporting Trinley Thaye Dorje (the minority) were thrown out of Rumtek by Indian security forces in order to quell violence between the two factions. Armed Indian soldiers still patrol the monastery to prevent further sectarian violence.

Gallery

See also
 Tourism in North East India

References

External links

 Rumtek details at Kaguoffice.org - Supporters of Ogyen 
 Rumtek Monastery's Official Website - Supporters of Ogyen Trinley Dorje
 Information on the Rumtek case in the Indian courts - Supporters of Trinley Thaye Dorje

Buddhist monasteries in Sikkim
Tibetan Buddhist monasteries and temples in India
Karma Kagyu monasteries and temples
1740 establishments in India
Religious organizations established in the 1740s
Gangtok
Tourism in Northeast India